Bostall Heath Football Club was a football club based in Welling, England.

History
From 1921 to 1939, Bostall Heath competed in the Premier Division of the London League. Bostall Heath entered the FA Cup for the first time in the 1931–32 season.

Ground
Bostall Heath played at Wickham Street in Welling.

Records
Best FA Cup performance: Third qualifying round, 1931–32
Best FA Amateur Cup performance: Third round, 1924–25

References

Defunct football clubs in England
London League (football)
Defunct football clubs in London
Sport in the London Borough of Bexley